Lindenwood Hall, also known as Sibley Hall, is a historic building located on the campus of Lindenwood University at St. Charles, St. Charles County, Missouri. The original section was built in 1857, with wings added in 1881 and 1887.  The original section is a three-story plus full basement, rectangular, red brick building measuring 73 feet wide by 48 feet deep.  It has Classical Revival and Italianate style detailing including a two-story front portico, paired arched windows, and a low hipped roof.  The three-story brick wings resulted in a "U"-shaped plan and feature three-story, three sided bay windows.

It was added to the National Register of Historic Places in 1978.

References

University and college buildings on the National Register of Historic Places in Missouri
Italianate architecture in Missouri
Neoclassical architecture in Missouri
University and college buildings completed in 1857
Buildings and structures in St. Charles County, Missouri
National Register of Historic Places in St. Charles County, Missouri
1857 establishments in Missouri